Perimycin, also known as aminomycin and fungimycin, is polyene antibiotic produced by Streptomyces coelicolor var. aminophilus. The compound exhibits antifungal properties.


Composition 
Perimycin is produced naturally as a mixture of three types: A, B and C, with type A being the major component. All types consist of a polyketide core with a perosamine sugar moiety. The variations occur at the end of the core opposite the perosamine moiety. Perimycin A has an aromatic group in this position, whereas the identities of the analogous groups in the other perimycin types are currently undetermined.

Usage 
Polyene antibiotics in general are often toxic to humans and have poor bioavailability. Thus, with the notable exception of amphotericin B, they are often not used clinically. Perimycin has been shown to be an effective antifungal compound, but is not widely used in clinical settings.

References 

Macrolide antibiotics
Antifungals
Polyenes